When I Look in Your Eyes is the fifth studio album by Canadian singer Diana Krall, released on June 8, 1999, by Verve Records. It was nominated for a Grammy Award for Album of the Year, the first time in 25 years that a jazz album was nominated in that category, and won two awards for Best Jazz Vocal and Best Engineered Album, Non-Classical at the 42nd Grammy Awards. The album also won the Juno Award for Best Vocal Jazz Album in 2000.

Track listing

Personnel
Credits adapted from the liner notes of When I Look in Your Eyes.

Musicians

 Diana Krall – piano ; vocals ; small ensemble arrangements ; co-arrangements 
 Russell Malone – guitar 
 John Clayton – bass ; co-arrangements 
 Jeff Hamilton – drums 
 Ben Wolfe – bass 
 Larry Bunker – vibes 
 Lewis Nash – drums 
 Pete Christlieb – saxophone 
 Chuck Berghofer – bass 
 Alan Broadbent – piano 
 Johnny Mandel – arrangements, conducting 
 Eddie Karam – conducting 
 Diana Krall Trio – small ensemble arrangements

Technical

 Tommy LiPuma – production 
 Johnny Mandel – production 
 Al Schmitt – recording, mixing
 David Foster – production 
 Bill Smith – recording engineering assistance, mixing engineering assistance
 Rory Romano – recording engineering assistance
 Anthony Ruotolo – recording engineering assistance
 Koji Egawa – mixing engineering assistance
 Doug Sax – mastering

Artwork
 Hollis King – art direction
 Isabelle Wong – graphic design
 Jane Shirek – photography

Charts

Weekly charts

Year-end charts

Decade-end charts

Certifications

References

1999 albums
Albums arranged by Johnny Mandel
Albums produced by David Foster
Albums produced by Tommy LiPuma
Covers albums
Diana Krall albums
Grammy Award for Best Jazz Vocal Album
Grammy Award for Best Engineered Album, Non-Classical
Juno Award for Vocal Jazz Album of the Year albums
Verve Records albums